The 1987 World Figure Skating Championships were held at the Riverfront Coliseum in Cincinnati, USA from March 10 to 15. Medals were awarded in men's singles, ladies' singles, pair skating, and ice dancing.

Medal tables

Medalists

Medals by country

Results

Men

Ladies

Pairs

Ice dancing

External links
 
 Result list provided by ISU
 For Boitano, Either It's a Hit or a Miss
 Thomas Has Fallen Upon Hard Times : Spotlight Moves Off '86 World Champion as Witt Woos the Fans

World Figure Skating Championships
World Figure Skating Championships
World Figure Skating Championships
International figure skating competitions hosted by the United States
March 1987 sports events in the United States
1987 in sports in Ohio
Sports competitions in Cincinnati
1980s in Cincinnati